Mount Bowlen is located on the border of Alberta and British Columbia and forms part of the Valley of the Ten Peaks. It was named in 1953 after John J. Bowlen, a native of Prince Edward Island, successful Alberta rancher, honorary chief of the Blackfoot, and a Lieutenant Governor of Alberta. Its former name was "Yamnee", which translates to the number 3 in the local Nakoda (Stoney) language.

Geology

The mountains in Banff Park are composed of sedimentary rock laid down during the Precambrian to Jurassic periods. Formed in shallow seas, this sedimentary rock was pushed east and over the top of younger rock during the Laramide orogeny.

Climate

Based on the Köppen climate classification, the mountain has a subarctic climate with cold, snowy winters, and mild summers. Temperatures can drop below  with wind chill factors below  in the winter.

See also
List of peaks on the Alberta–British Columbia border

References

Further reading
 Dave Birrell, 50 Roadside Panoramas in the Canadian Rockies, P 87

 Western Canada, P 280

 Paul Zizka, Summits and Starlight: The Canadian Rockies

Gallery

External links
 Parks Canada web site: Banff National Park
 Mount Bowlen weather: Mountain Forecast

Three-thousanders of Alberta
Three-thousanders of British Columbia
Mountains of Banff National Park
Kootenay National Park